Marija Leković (born 2 June 1963) is a Serbian politician. She is currently serving her second term as a member of Belgrade's city council.

Leković first served on city council from June 2012 to November 2013 as a member of the Democratic Party (Demokratska stranka, DS). She later joined Aleksandar Šapić's Serbian Patriotic Alliance (Srpski patriotski savez, SPAS) and was briefly a member of the National Assembly of Serbia in 2020 before being appointed as an assistant minister in Serbia's ministry of family welfare and demography. Leković is now a member of the Serbian Progressive Party (Srpska napredna stranka, SNS).

Early life and career
Leković was born in Belgrade, in what was then the Socialist Republic of Serbia in the Socialist Federal Republic of Yugoslavia. She graduated from the University of Belgrade's Faculty of Civil Engineering with a focus in hydraulic engineering, was an employee of Stankom proing from 1992 to 1998, and worked in the Belgrade municipality of Zvezdara's department of construction and communal inspection from 1998 to 2008.

Politician

Democratic Party
From 2008 to 2009, Leković was an assistant to the mayor of Zvezdara. She was appointed to the Zvezdara municipal council (i.e., the executive branch of the municipal government) on 18 March 2009 and served in this role for the remainder of the term.

Leković received the ninth position on the DS's electoral list for the City Assembly of Belgrade and the third position on its list for the Zvezdara municipal assembly in the 2012 Serbian local elections. She was elected to both local parliaments when the DS alliance won fifty out of 110 mandates in the city and twenty-three out of fifty-three in the municipality. The party formed coalition governments at both levels, and she was initially re-appointed to the Zvezdara municipal council on 11 June. 

Two days later, on 13 June 2012, she was appointed to the Belgrade city council with responsibility for overseeing the city's traffic department. She was required to resign from the municipal council by virtue of accepting this position, which she did on 26 June. 

Leković was a member of the Belgrade city council until 18 November 2013, when Democratic Party mayor Dragan Đilas lost a vote of non-confidence in the assembly and his government fell. A new city election was called for 2014; Leković received the seventh position on the DS's list and was re-elected when the list won twenty-two mandates. The Serbian Progressive Party (Srpska napredna stranka, SNS) and its allies won the election, and the DS served in opposition. Leković also received the 191st position on the DS's list in the concurrent 2014 Serbian parliamentary election. This was too low a position for election to be a realistic prospect, and she was not elected when the DS list won only nineteen seats.

Serbian Patriotic Alliance
Leković left the DS in November 2014 and joined Aleksandar Šapić's For Our City association. She served with Šapić's group for the remainder of the assembly term; in January 2018, she was appointed as its representative on Belgrade's election commission. She was not a candidate in the 2018 city election.

Šapić's political movement was reconstituted as the Serbian Patriotic Alliance in July 2018, and Leković became a member of the new party. She appeared in the fourth position on the SPAS list in the 2020 parliamentary election and was elected when the list won eleven mandates. Her term in the assembly was brief; she resigned on 19 November 2020. She now serves as an assistant minister in Serbia's ministry of family welfare and demography.

Serbian Progressive Party
In May 2021, Luković took part in negotiations that led to the Serbian Patriotic Alliance's merger into the Serbian Progressive Party.

Luković's longtime political ally Aleksandar Šapić was chosen as mayor of Belgrade on 20 June 2022, and Luković was herself re-appointed to city council on the same day. She is seen as a powerful figure in the administration, with some media reports describing her as the mayor's "right hand."

References

1963 births
Living people
Politicians from Belgrade
Members of the City Assembly of Belgrade
Members of the City Council of Belgrade
Members of the National Assembly (Serbia)
Democratic Party (Serbia) politicians
Serbian Patriotic Alliance politicians
Serbian Progressive Party politicians